Empire Builder is the fourth studio album by American musician Laura Gibson. It was released in April 2016 under Barsuk Records.

Gibson has stated that the title track was written when travelling from Oregon on the Empire Builder in order to start an MFA program in creative fiction at Hunter College New York.

Track listing

References

2016 albums
Barsuk Records albums
Laura Gibson albums